Hell's Highway may refer to:

 a nickname for Highway 69 during the Second World War Operation Market Garden
 Hell's Highway (1932 film), a crime film
 Hell's Highway (2002 film), a horror film
 Brothers in Arms: Hell's Highway, a 2008 videogame by Ubisoft based on Operation Market Garden
 Hell's Highway, a 1983 board game by Victory Games, based on Operation Market Garden, see List of board wargames
 Hell's Highway, a 1983 video game by Avalon Hill, see List of Avalon Hill games
 Hell's Highway: The True Story of Highway Safety Films, a 2002 documentary film by Bret Wood
 Violent Road, a 1958 film also known as Hell's Highway

See also 
 Highway to Hell (disambiguation)
 Highway Thru Hell, Canadian reality TV show
 Saskatchewan Highway 35, the "Highway from Hell"